Kurukavak may refer to:

 Kurukavak, Akçakoca, in Düzce Province, Turkey
 Kurukavak, Beşiri, in Batman Province, Turkey